Hackenberger is a surname. Notable people with the surname include:

Bessie Mecklem Hackenberger (1876–1942), American saxophonist
Ron Hackenberger (born 1935/36), American businessman and car collector